Atefeh, is a feminine given name of Persian origin.

People with this name include:
 Atefeh Ahmadi (born 2000), Iranian alpine skier
 Atefeh Nabavi, Iranian student activist
 Atefeh Razavi (born 1969), Iranian actress and makeup artist
 Atefeh Riazi, American information technologist
 Atefeh Sahaaleh (1987–2004), Iranian convicted woman, charged with crime after being raped for many years, and then executed

Persian feminine given names
Arabic feminine given names